This is a list of islands of Lithuania.

Notable islands in Lithuania include:
Antakščiai Island, Lake Antakščiai
Baluošo Ilgasalė, Lake Baluošas
Bažnytėlė Island, Lake Galvė, Trakai, 
Beržoras Island, Lake Beržoras, 
Briedsalė, Lake Plateliai
Briedžiai Island, Nemunas Delta
Calves Island, Lake Plateliai
Castle Island, Lake Plateliai
Gaidsalė, Lake Plateliai
Ilgio Islands, Lake Ilgis
Jonava Neris Island, Neris, Jonava
Kiaulės Nugara (Sala Kiaulės Nugara), Curonian Lagoon, Klaipėda, 
Kiemas Island, Curonian Lagoon
Kubiliai Island, Curonian Lagoon
Nemunas Island, Neman, Kaunas
Pilis Island, Lake Galvė, Trakai
Pliksalė, Lake Plateliai
Ragininkai Island, Neman, 
Rusnė Island, Nemunas Delta, 
Šončelio Island, Lake Plateliai
Triušiai Island, Curonian Lagoon, 
Ubagsalė, Lake Plateliai
Veršių Island, Lake Plateliai
Vytinė Island (Vito Sala), Curonian Lagoon, 
Žingelinė (Zingelinės Sala), Curonian Lagoon, 
Žvėrynas Neris Island, Neris, Vilnius

See also 
List of islands in the Baltic Sea
List of islands

References

 List
Lithuania
Islands